The Atlas Mountain skink (Chalcides montanus) is a species of skink endemic to the Atlas Mountains in Morocco. It was originally described as Chalcides ocellatus ssp. montanus.

References

Chalcides
Skinks of Africa
Reptiles of North Africa
Endemic fauna of Morocco
Reptiles described in 1931
Taxa named by Franz Werner